Yvonand railway station is a railway station in the municipality of Yvonand, in the Swiss canton of Vaud. It is an intermediate stop on the standard gauge Fribourg–Yverdon line of Swiss Federal Railways.

Services
The following services stop at Yvonand:

References

External links 
 
 

Railway stations in the canton of Vaud
Swiss Federal Railways stations